D Sports Racing now known as Prototype 2 is a sports prototype racecar class for road racing by the Sports Car Club of America. It has been called the one racing category that remains unfettered by regulations that have throttled innovation elsewhere in motorsport.

Usually known simply as DSR, the class began in 1968. DSR evolved from the SCCA's older H Modified class, which traces its roots back to the early 1950s.  Today's DSR cars normally use a 1000cc four cylinder engine sourced from a Japanese motorcycle.  Several other engines are allowed.

DSR's generally weigh under 1000 lbs with the driver and make 200 bhp at 13,000rpm.  The relatively low cost of the engines and some new chassis manufacturers led to an explosion in growth of the class between the years 2000 and 2008. DSR's were the fastest class at the SCCA National Championship races in 2008.

Manufacturers 

 A-Mac
 Cheetah
 Diasio
 Dragon 
 Galmer
 LSR Prince
 Radical
 Speads
 Stohr Cars
 West Race Cars

SCCA National Championship Runoffs

References

External links 
 Sports Car Club of America
 Sports Racer Network

Sports Car Club of America
Sports car racing series
Sports prototypes